Cichlidogyrus centesimus is a species of monopisthocotylean monogenean in the family Dactylogyridae. It was first found infecting the gills of Ophthalmotilapia ventralis in Lake Tanganyika. It can be differentiated from its cogenerates by possessing a spirally coiled thickening at the end of its penis, the accessory piece in the genital apparatus being nonexistent, and a particular uncinuli configuration in its haptor.

References

Further reading
Bukinga, Fidel Muterezi, et al. "Ancyrocephalidae (Monogenea) of Lake Tanganyika: III: Cichlidogyrus infecting the world’s biggest cichlid and the non-endemic tribes Haplochromini, Oreochromini and Tylochromini (Teleostei, Cichlidae)." Parasitology research 111.5 (2012): 2049–2061.
Pariselle, Antoine, et al. "Ancyrocephalidae (Monogenea) of Lake Tanganyika: IV: Cichlidogyrus parasitizing species of Bathybatini (Teleostei, Cichlidae): reduced host-specificity in the deepwater realm?." Hydrobiologia 748.1 (2015): 99–119.

Dactylogyridae
Animals described in 2011